The 2017 WNBA season will be the 20th season for the Dallas Wings franchise of the WNBA. This will be the franchise's 2nd season in Dallas.  The season tips off on May 14. Dallas started the season steadily posting an 8–8 record in May and June.  It was a rocky July (3–6) but the team recovered in August by going 5–3.  Despite losing their lone September game, the team qualified for the playoffs as the 7th seed with a 16–18 record.  Dallas lost in the first round of the playoffs to the Washington Mystics, ending their season.

Transactions

WNBA Draft

2017 roster

Game log

Preseason

|- style="background:#fcc;"
| 1
| April 29
| San Antonio
| L 81–87
| Davis (13)
| 3 Tied  (6)
| Phillips (4)
| AT&T Center  2,834
| 0–1

|- style="background:#bbffbb;"
| 2
| May 6
| Indiana
| W 80–75
| Davis (14)
|
|
| College Park Center
| 1–1

Regular season

|- style="background:#bbffbb;"
| 1
| May 14
| Phoenix
| W 68–58
| Davis (20)
| Johnson (14)
| Davis (4)
| Talking Stick Resort Arena9,640
| 1–0
|- style="background:#fcc;"
| 2
| May 20
| Minnesota
| L 87–89
| Diggins-Smith (22)
| Johnson (7)
| Diggins-Smith (8)
| College Park Center5,169
| 1–1
|- style="background:#bbffbb;"
| 3
| May 25
| San Antonio
| W 94–82
| Christmas (18)
| Johnson (11)
| Diggins-Smith (8)
| AT&T Center9,621
| 2–1
|- style="background:#fcc;"
| 4
| May 27
| Phoenix
| L 65–107
| Johnson (12)
| 2 Tied (6)
| Diggins-Smith (4)
| Talking Stick Resort Arena9,245
| 2–2
|- style="background:#bbffbb;"
| 5
| May 30
| Indiana
| W 89–62
| Christmas (27)
| Gray (9)
| Diggins-Smith (7)
| College Park Center3,076
| 3–2

|- style="background:#fcc;"
| 6
| June 2
| New York
| L 89–93
| Diggins-Smith (20)
| Christmas (9)
| 2 Tied (3)
| Madison Square Garden7,426
| 3–3
|- style="background:#fcc;"
| 7
| June 3
| Indiana
| L 85–91
| Johnson (22)
| Johnson (13)
| Diggins-Smith (5)
| Bankers Life Fieldhouse6,529
| 3–4
|- style="background:#fcc;"
| 8
| June 6
| Washington
| L 89–101
| Diggins-Smith (23)
| 2 Tied (8)
| Diggins-Smith (7)
| College Park Center2,805
| 3–5
|- style="background:#bbffbb;"
| 9
| June 9
| Los Angeles
| W 96–90
| Johnson (24)
| Johnson (12)
| Diggins-Smith (8)
| College Park Center3,169
| 4–5
|- style="background:#fcc;"
| 10
| June 11
| Minnesota
| L 74–91
| Christmas (21)
| Johnson (8)
| Diggins-Smith (4)
| College Park Center3,998
| 4–6
|- style="background:#fcc;"
| 11
| June 13
| Los Angeles
| L 87–97
| Diggins-Smith (28)
| Johnson (10)
| Diggins-Smith (7)
| Staples Center7,233
| 4–7
|- style="background:#fcc;"
| 12
| June 16
| New York
| L 93–102
| Diggins-Smith (23)
| Johnson (11)
| Johnson (3)
| College Park Center3,152
| 4–8
|- style="background:#bbffbb;"
| 13
| June 18
| Washington
| W 87–83
| Johnson (27)
| Plaisance (8)
| Diggins-Smith (8)
| Verizon Center7,285
| 5–8
|- style="background:#bbffbb;"
| 14
| June 21
| San Antonio
| W 81–78
| Johnson (25)
| Johnson (10)
| Diggins-Smith (6)
| College Park Center4,617
| 6–8
|- style="background:#bbffbb;"
| 15
| June 23
| San Antonio
| W 81–69
| Diggins-Smith (30)
| Plaisance (8)
| 2 Tied (5)
| AT&T Center7,086
| 7–8
|- style="background:#bbffbb;"
| 16
| June 25
| Connecticut
| W 96–82
| Christmas (24)
| Plaisance (9)
| Diggins-Smith (9)
| College Park Center3,408
| 8–8

|- style="background:#fcc;"
| 17
| July 1
| Seattle
| L 69–89
| Johnson (18)
| Johnson (10)
| Diggins-Smith (4)
| College Park Center4,038
| 8–9
|- style="background:#bbffbb;"
| 18
| July 5
| Atlanta
| W 94–84
| Diggins-Smith (21)
| Johnson (7)
| Diggins-Smith (7)
| College Park Center3,555
| 9–9
|- style="background:#fcc;"
| 19
| July 9
| Atlanta
| L 78–98
| Diggins-Smith (22)
| Johnson (13)
| Diggins-Smith (7)
| McCamish Pavilion4,109
| 9–10
|- style="background:#fcc;"
| 20
| July 12
| Chicago
| L 84–90
| Diggins-Smith (20)
| Plaisance (5)
| Diggins-Smith (5)
| Allstate Arena14,102
| 9–11
|- style="background:#bbffbb;"
| 21
| July 16
| Chicago
| W 112–106
| Diggins-Smith (26)
| Johnson (9)
| Christmas (3)
| College Park Center3,693
| 10–11
|- style="background:#fcc;"
| 22
| July 19
| Minnesota
| L 74–100
| Diggins-Smith (23)
| Johnson (8)
| Diggins-Smith (9)
| Xcel Energy Center17,834
| 10–12
|- style="background:#bbffbb;"
| 23
| July 25
| Indiana
| W 84–82
| Diggins-Smith (21)
| Paris (10)
| Diggins-Smith (4)
| College Park Center3,701
| 11–12
|- style="background:#fcc;"
| 24
| July 28
| Seattle
| L 93–109
| Diggins-Smith (18)
| Johnson (8)
| Diggins-Smith (7)
| KeyArena7,797
| 11–13
|- style="background:#fcc;"
| 25
| July 30
| Los Angeles
| L 74–95
| Powers (23)
| Johnson (5)
| Diggins-Smith (6)
| Staples Center11,053
| 11–14

|- style="background:#bbffbb;"
| 26
| August 4
| Seattle
| W 93–80
| Diggins-Smith (23)
| Johnson (16)
| Diggins-Smith (7)
| College Park Center3,712
| 12–14
|- style="background:#bbffbb;"
| 27
| August 6
| Los Angeles
| W 85–79
| Johnson (23)
| Johnson (13)
| 3 Tied (3)
| College Park Center3,903
| 13–14
|- style="background:#fcc;"
| 28
| August 10
| Phoenix
| L 100–101
| Johnson (25)
| Johnson (15)
| Johnson (5)
| College Park Center4,165
| 13–15
|- style="background:#fcc;"
| 29
| August 12
| Connecticut
| L 88–96
| Gray (21)
| Johnson (12)
| Diggins-Smith (5)
| Mohegan Sun Arena6,898
| 13–16
|- style="background:#bbffbb;"
| 30
| August 19
| Atlanta
| W 90–86
| Johnson (23)
| Johnson (13)
| Diggins-Smith (11)
| College Park Center4,962
| 14–16
|- style="background:#fcc;"
| 31
| August 23
| Connecticut
| L 87–93
| Diggins-Smith (19)
| Thornton (9)
| Diggins-Smith (6)
| Mohegan Sun Arena6,465
| 14–17
|- style="background:#bbffbb;"
| 32
| August 26
| Washington
| W 83–78
| Diggins-Smith (20)
| Johnson (11)
| Diggins-Smith (7)
| Capital One Arena8,656
| 15–17
|- style="background:#bbffbb;"
| 33
| August 30
| Chicago
| W 99–96
| Diggins-Smith (28)
| 2 Tied (9)
| Diggins-Smith (8)
| Allstate Arena5,896
| 16–17

|- style="background:#fcc;"
| 34
| September 3
| New York
| L 81–82
| Johnson (17)
| Johnson (8)
| 2 Tied (4)
| College Park Center4,701
| 16–18

Playoffs

|- style="background:#fcc;"
| 1
| September 6
| Washington
| L 86-76
| Powers (21)
| Johnson (14)
| 4 Tied'' (3)
| Capital One Arena  6,483
| 0-1

Standings

Playoffs

Awards and honors

References

External links
The Official Site of the Dallas Wings

Dallas Wings seasons
Dallas Wings